is a railway station in Suita, Osaka, Japan, on the Osaka Metro Midosuji Line and the Kita-Osaka Kyuko Railway Namboku Line. The station is numbered "M11"; it is the northernmost station in the Osaka subway system.

Lines
Esaka Station is served by the Osaka Metro Midosuji Line and the Kita-Osaka Kyuko Railway Namboku Line.

Station layout
The station consists of an elevated island platform serving two tracks. The second floor has a wicket concourse. The platform is located on the third floor.

Platforms

Adjacent stations

History
The station opened on 24 February 1970.

Surrounding area
 Duskin headquarters
 Acecook headquarters
 Kirindo headquarters
  headquarters
 SNK headquarters
 Shin-Osaka/Esaka Tokyu Inn
 Yoyogi Seminar, Esaka school
 Daido Life Insurance building
 Esaka park
 Suita municipal library
 Cat Music College
 Hobby Center Kato Osaka

Roads

References

External links

  

Railway stations in Japan opened in 1970
Railway stations in Osaka Prefecture
Osaka Metro stations